Alfred L. Bright (January 9, 1940 – October 28, 2019) was an American artist and art educator. He became "the first African American full-time faculty member" at his alma mater, Youngstown State University, and he was the founder and director of its Africana Studies program from 1970 to 1987. His work can be seen in many museums, including the Butler Institute of American Art and the Canton Museum of Art.

References

1940 births
2019 deaths
Youngstown State University alumni
Kent State University alumni
Artists from Ohio
African-American academics
African-American artists
Youngstown State University faculty
20th-century African-American people
21st-century African-American people